Richard Francis "Dick" Zokol (born August 21, 1958) is a Canadian professional golfer who has played on the Canadian Tour, PGA Tour and Nationwide Tour, winning at least one event in each venue.

Amateur career 
Zokol was born in Kitimat, British Columbia. He attended Brigham Young University in Provo, Utah, and was the captain of the 1981 NCAA championship golf team. He was also an All-American selection in 1981, on the Second Team. He was a teammate of future fellow PGA Tour players Rick Fehr, Keith Clearwater and Bobby Clampett; he was Clampett's roommate for three years. He won the 1981 Canadian Amateur Championship, in a one-hole sudden death playoff over Blaine McCallister.

Professional career 
In 1981, he turned professional and joined the PGA Tour later in 1981. Zokol had 20 top-10 finishes in PGA Tour events during his career, including two wins in 1992 but only one that is considered official. His best finish in a major championship was T14 at the 1993 PGA Championship.

Zokol has suffered from various injuries during his career, and has taken time off to pursue other business ventures including "Director of Golf" for Eaglequest Golf Centers, Inc., a North American golf center consolidator. He lives in White Rock, British Columbia and also works with the Royal Canadian Golf Association, advising on elite player development.

Amateur wins
1981 Canadian Amateur Championship

Professional wins (5)

PGA Tour wins (1)

Buy.com Tour wins (1)

Canadian Tour wins (1)
1982 British Columbia Open

Other wins (2)

Results in major championships

Note: Zokol never played in The Open Championship.

CUT = missed the half-way cut
"T" = tied

Team appearances
Amateur
Eisenhower Trophy (representing Canada): 1980

Professional
World Cup (representing Canada): 1992, 1993
Dunhill Cup (representing Canada): 1986, 1987, 1988, 1989, 1992, 1993

See also
Fall 1981 PGA Tour Qualifying School graduates
1982 PGA Tour Qualifying School graduates
1986 PGA Tour Qualifying School graduates
1989 PGA Tour Qualifying School graduates
1991 PGA Tour Qualifying School graduates
2001 Buy.com Tour graduates

References

External links

Profile at the Canadian Golf Hall of Fame

Canadian male golfers
BYU Cougars men's golfers
PGA Tour golfers
Korn Ferry Tour graduates
Golfing people from British Columbia
People from Kitimat
People from White Rock, British Columbia
1958 births
Living people